Pasir Panjang Group Representation Constituency  (Traditional Chinese: 巴西班讓集選區; Simplified Chinese: 巴西班让集选区) is a defunct Group Representation Constituency in Pasir Panjang, Singapore, that existed only from 1988 to 1991.

Members of Parliament

Candidates and results

Elections in 1980s

See also
Brickworks GRC

References

Singaporean electoral divisions
Bedok